Case is an English language name, usually a surname but sometimes a given name. The given name may be a diminutive of Casey. The name may refer to:

Surname
Allen Case (1934–1986), American actor
Andie Case (born 1992), American singer
Andrew Case (born 1993), Canadian baseball player
Augustus Case (1812–1893), American admiral 
Box Case (1895–1969), British cricketer
Cale Case (born 1958), American politician
Clarence E. Case (1877–1961), American politician
Clifford P. Case (1904–1982), American politician
Ed Case (born 1952), American politician
Ermine Cowles Case (1871–1953), American paleontologist
Everett Case (1900–1966), American basketball coach 
Frank Case (1872–1946), American hotelier and writer
George Case (baseball) (1915–1989), American baseball player
Janet Elizabeth Case (1863-1937), British classical scholar and women's rights advocate
Jean Case (born 1959), American philanthropist
Jerome Case (1819–1891), American manufacturer 
John Case (disambiguation), multiple people
Johnny Case (born 1989), American mixed martial artist 
Joseph Case (died 1610), Polish rabbi
Jimmy Case (born 1954), British football player
Karl E. Case (born 1946), American economist
Luella J. B. Case (1807–1857), American author, hymn writer
Marietta Stanley Case (1845–1900), American author and temperance advocate
Matt Case (born 1986), American ice hockey player
Neko Case (born 1970), American musician
Nicky Case, Canadian game developer
Norman S. Case (1888–1967), American politician
Paul Foster Case (1884–1954), American occultist
Peter Case (born 1954), American musician
Reginald Case (1937–2009), American artist 
Scott Case (born 1962), American football player
Sharon Case (born 1971), American actress
Simon Case (born 1978), British civil servant, head of the Home Civil Service
Squire S. Case (1801–1878), American politician
Steve Case (born 1958), American businessman
Stevie Case (born 1976), American game designer
Stoney Case (born 1972), American football player
Sue-Ellen Case (born 1942), American critic and academic 
Theodore Case (1888–1944), American scientist
William Case (1818–1862), American politician
William Case (cricketer) (1873–1922), English cricketer

Given name
Case (singer) (born 1975), American singer, full name Case Woodward
Case Cookus (born 1995), American football player
Case Broderick (1839–1920), American politician
Case Keenum (born 1988), American football player
Case Ootes (born 1941), Canadian politician

Fiction
 Henry Dorsett Case, a fictional character in Neuromancer
Lincoln Case, fictional character in the American television series Route 66
Tiffany Case, fictional character in James Bond novel and film Diamonds Are Forever
 CASE, a fictional character in Christopher Nolan's film Interstellar

See also
Case (disambiguation)
Casey (given name)

English-language surnames
Surnames